Střemchoví is a village and administrative part of Dolní Loučky in Brno-Country District in the South Moravian Region of the Czech Republic.

2811 Střemchoví, an asteroid, was named after this village.

Notable people
Antonín Mrkos (1918–1996), astronomer

Gallery

Populated places in Brno-Country District